The Sony Xperia XA1 is a smartphone produced by Sony. Part of the Xperia X Series, the device was unveiled along with the Sony Xperia XZ Premium, Sony Xperia XZs and Sony Xperia XA1 Ultra at the annual Mobile World Congress in February 2017.

Specifications

Hardware
It features a 23 megapixel rear camera, an 8 megapixel front-facing camera, headphone jack, 32 GB of on board storage (which can be expanded up to 256 GB via micro SD) and a 720p display.

Software
It runs on Android 7.0 "Nougat" out of the box.

References

External links

Android (operating system) devices
Sony smartphones
Mobile phones introduced in 2017